André Bordang (8 August 1875 – 28 February 1954) was a Luxembourgian gymnast who competed in the 1912 Summer Olympics. In 1912 he was a member of the Luxembourgian team which finished fourth in the team, European system competition and fifth in the team, free system event.

References

External links
list of Luxembourgian gymnasts
André Bordang's profile at Sports Reference.com

1875 births
1954 deaths
Luxembourgian male artistic gymnasts
Olympic gymnasts of Luxembourg
Gymnasts at the 1912 Summer Olympics